Qilla Abdullah Railway Station (Balochi: قلعہ عبداللہ ریلوے اسٹیشن) is located in Qilla Abdullah town, Qilla Abdullah district of Balochistan province of the Pakistan.

See also
 List of railway stations in Pakistan
 Pakistan Railways

References

External links

Railway stations in Qila Abdullah District
Railway stations on Rohri–Chaman Railway Line